"Nu tändas tusen juleljus" is a Christian traditional Swedish language Christmas song, written in 1898 by the Swedish song text writer Emmy Köhler (both text and melody). Translated into English, the title literally means "Now are lit a thousand Christmas candles". The theme of the song is the gospel of the newborn Christ and specifically its aspects of domestic harmony and inner peace, brought by the lights of candles as well as of the stars above, most importantly the star of Bethlehem. It was one of the most popular Christmas songs in Sweden during the 20th century, in churches, homes and schools. Swedish pop singer Agnetha Fältskog recorded the song on her album "Nu tändas tusen juleljus", named after the song, with her daughter Linda Ulvaeus.

The song was also covered by artists and groups like Evie (both 1974 and 1976, also in English), Carola Häggkvist (1983), Wizex (1993), and Lill Lindfors (1991). Swedish punk band Ebba Grön, who recorded the song in 1980, altered the lyrics and called the song "Nu släckas tusen människoliv" ("Now a thousand of human lives are put out"). This version is about homelessness.

The Norwegian language version is Nå tennes tusen julelys and has been recorded by artists such as Elisabeth Andreassen and Sissel Kyrkjebø. There is also a Spanish language version called "Mil Luces" that appeared on an album entitled "Felicidad en Navidad" by an unknown artist, which was distributed by Fuente de Vida.

Titles in other languages 
 Finnish language: Nyt syttyy valot tuhannet (also Nyt sytytämme kynttilän)
 Danish language: Nu tændes tusind julelys
 Faroese language: Nú tendrast túsund jólaljós
 Icelandic language: Við kveikjum einu kerti á
 Norwegian language: Nå tennes tusen julelys
 Swedish language: Nu tändas tusen juleljus
 Indonesian language: Seribu Lilin
 Different melody: Russian language version, V lesu rodilas elochka

The Russian language version, В лесу родилась ёлочка (The Forest Raised a Christmas Tree), is commonly claimed to have been written based on this song in 1903 and set to music in 1905 by the amateur composer Leonid Karlovich Beckmann. The tune of the song is only slightly different than the Nordic language ones.

See also
Jul i Betlehem

References

External links
Lyrics on Swedish Wikisource

1898 songs
Agnetha Fältskog songs
Carola Häggkvist songs
Swedish Christmas songs
Elisabeth Andreassen songs
Wizex songs
Songs about Jesus
Hep Stars songs